Beiji, formerly Mohe Township, is a town located in Mohe, Daxing'anling Prefecture. It is the northernmost town in China. 

Beiji is most famous for its tourism. There are three villages in Beiji: Beiji Village (the northernmost village in China and seat of government), Beihong Village, Luoguhe Village, and Oroqen Ethnic Village. Beiji has a population of about 3,000, and a population density of 1/sq km. Beiji is 2,380 sq km large.

References 

Township-level divisions of Heilongjiang
Daxing'anling Prefecture